The 1999–2000 FAW Premier Cup was the third season of the tournament since its founding in 1997.

Group stage

Group A

Group B

Group C

Quarter finals

Semi finals

First leg

Second leg

Final

References

General

1999-2000
Prem